Timothy Deane Sylvia (born March 5, 1976) is an American retired mixed martial arts (MMA) fighter, professional wrestler, and a former two-time UFC Heavyweight Champion. He has competed as a Super Heavyweight and Heavyweight. While he is best known for competing in the UFC, Sylvia has also fought for  Affliction, the International Fighting Championships (IFC), and ONE FC.

Background
Sylvia was born and raised in Ellsworth, Maine, attending Ellsworth High School and graduating in 1992. He joined a karate school as a child, and began wrestling in high school. After graduation, he worked construction, community gardening, hanging sheet rock, as a bouncer, and painting houses. After high school, he played semi-pro football for three years before becoming interested in MMA, and began to train with Marcus Davis, a fellow bouncer. During this time Sylvia decided to take up boxing and grappling. After training for a year, and winning grappling tournaments, he got the opportunity to fight in a Rhode Island no holds barred amateur event, in which he knocked out his opponent in 17 seconds.

A long time UFC fan, Sylvia and some friends attended UFC 28 in Atlantic City, New Jersey in 2000. In late 2000 Sylvia sold all of his belongings and moved to Bettendorf, Iowa, to train with Team Miletich which had members such as former UFC champions Matt Hughes and Jens Pulver. Sylvia was promoted to a purple belt in Brazilian Jiu-Jitsu on October 31, 2011.

Mixed martial arts career

Early professional career
Sylvia made his professional MMA debut in 2001 fighting for the IFC. He went on to rack up thirteen consecutive wins with ten knockouts in organizations such as the Hawaii-based SuperBrawl, and Extreme Challenge.

Ultimate Fighting Championship
In 2002, Sylvia signed with the Ultimate Fighting Championship and won a TKO victory over Wesley "Cabbage" Correira at UFC 39 when Correira's corner threw in the towel. Sylvia then went on to defeat Ricco Rodriguez at UFC 41, winning the UFC heavyweight championship for the first time. Soon after Sylvia defended his title with another quick victory over Gan McGee at UFC 44.

Controversy
After the fight with McGee, Sylvia tested positive for the banned substance Stanozolol. He voluntarily forfeited his title and was handed a six-month suspension, and fined $10,000 by the Nevada State Athletic Commission (NSAC). He later commented that the steroid usage was for shedding excess weight. Sylvia apologized and made no effort to claim innocence.

Injury

At UFC 48 in June 2004, Sylvia returned to face Frank Mir for the vacant UFC Heavyweight Championship; he lost. Early on in the fight Mir trapped Sylvia's right arm in an armbar submission attempt. As Sylvia tried to escape the hold, Sylvia's right radius bone snapped about three inches below his elbow. Referee Herb Dean immediately stopped the fight and declared Sylvia unable to continue. Sylvia took exception to the decision and repeatedly claimed his arm was not broken (though the break could be explicitly seen on the slow-motion replay of the fight), even touching it and moving it around to demonstrate. Sylvia was taken to a local hospital where an x-ray revealed that his arm was in fact broken; he then took several months off to recuperate. Afterward, Sylvia said he was glad the referee stopped the fight, thereby saving his arm from further damage.

Return
Six months after his loss to Frank Mir, Sylvia returned (a titanium plate had been attached to his forearm) to the UFC in February 2005, taking on Andrei Arlovski to crown an interim UFC heavyweight champion as Mir, while still the nominal UFC champion, had suffered numerous injuries from a motorcycle accident that left him unable to defend his title. Sylvia was knocked to the ground by an overhand right punch, and while on the ground was caught in an Achilles lock and submitted.

In May 2005, Sylvia defeated Mike Block in the IFC by TKO, then went on to face MMA veteran Tra Telligman at UFC 54. With one second left in the first round, Sylvia landed a left head kick which knocked out Telligman. Sylvia made his cable television debut next, fighting Assuerio Silva at Ultimate Fight Night 3 on Spike TV, winning a unanimous decision after three rounds in a match that was intended to decide the next number one contender.

Reclaiming the title
At UFC 59, Sylvia was finally awarded his rematch with the then-outright champion Andrei Arlovski. After being knocked down by Arlovski, Sylvia won the fight via knockout in round one.

Sylvia next defended his championship in a trilogy fight with Andrei Arlovski at UFC 61. Sylvia utilized his reach and size advantage to win the uneventful fight by unanimous decision.

Sylvia next fought Mundials world Jiu-Jitsu champion, 2-time ADCC world champion and Jiu-Jitsu Pan American champion Jeff Monson at UFC 65. Billed as a classic "striker vs. grappler" match, Sylvia won again via unanimous decision by keeping the fight on the outside with the jab.

On March 3, 2007, Sylvia fought former UFC Heavyweight and UFC Light Heavyweight champion Randy Couture at UFC 68. After being knocked down by Couture he lost the fight and title by decision.

On October 20, 2007 at UFC 77, Sylvia defeated Brandon Vera via unanimous decision (29–28, 29–27, 29–28). In the post-fight interview he called out Cheick Kongo to fight for the spot as number one contender for the heavyweight championship belt.

On February 2, 2008 Sylvia lost via guillotine choke to Antônio Rodrigo Nogueira at UFC 81 in Las Vegas for the interim heavyweight championship.

Early in 2008, Sylvia requested and was granted a release from his UFC contract, which still had one fight remaining on it.  Sylvia cited unhappiness with pay, desire to face Fedor Emelianenko, the non-exclusive contracts of other organizations, and the opportunity to fight more often as his reasons for leaving.

Post-UFC
On March 28, 2008, Sylvia signed with Adrenaline MMA, formerly M-1 Global, to a two-year contract that allowed him to fight for other organizations while under contract with Adrenaline. A few weeks later he was offered to fight Fedor Emelianenko at Affliction Clothing's inaugural event Affliction: Banned. The fight took place on July 19, 2008, and saw the Russian dropping Sylvia and taking his back before securing a rear naked choke, forcing Sylvia to submit at 0:36 of the first round.

On February 25, 2009, Sylvia's manager (and Adrenaline MMA CEO) Monte Cox announced that Sylvia would face former boxing world heavyweight champion and 1988 Olympic gold medalist Ray Mercer in a boxing main event at Adrenaline MMA III on May 30, 2009, at the Trump Taj Mahal Casino Resort in Atlantic City. However, after the New Jersey State Athletic Control Board refused to sanction the fight, the event was moved to Birmingham Jefferson Civic Center in Birmingham, Alabama and rescheduled to June 13. Only days before the bout, it was changed to be contested under MMA rules, again because of sanctioning problems. When they finally met, Mercer knocked Sylvia out with a single punch nine seconds into the first round. Sylvia weighed in at 310.6 pounds for the Super Heavyweight fight.

Before his bout with Mercer, Sylvia was scheduled to face Paul Buentello at Affliction: Trilogy. But after the devastating KO loss, Cox and Affliction decided it would be best for Sylvia to sit out the next few months, because of his recent losses.

After Affliction folded, Sylvia defeated Jason Riley via TKO (punches) 2:32 into the first round at the Adrenaline IV main event on September 18, 2009 in Council Bluffs, Iowa. It was later revealed through Sherdog.com that Sylvia broke his right hand about a minute and a half into his fight with Riley, spoiling a debut with the Japanese promotion Dream, planned for October 25.

Sylvia's next fight was expected to be a rematch with The Ultimate Fighter alumni Wes Sims on March, 20th in Ohio.  However, the Ohio State Athletic Commission refused to sanction the bout, saying that the fight was "non-competitive", resulting in the bout being rescheduled to June 6, 2010, in Nova Scotia, Canada, for the IFC Superheavyweight title.

In the meantime, Sylvia fought five time World's Strongest Man Mariusz Pudzianowski at Moosin: God of Martial Arts on May 21, 2010, winning by submission (punches).

The Sims fight was scuttled again (as well as another against UFC veteran Pedro Rizzo), when it was discovered that Sylvia broke his foot at Moosin.

Sylvia defeated Paul Buentello by Knockout due to an uppercut at Powerhouse World Promotions: War on the Mainland on August 14.
As heavyweight fighter Pedro Rizzo entered the ring during the post fight interview, Powerhouse World Promotions announced Sylvia would make his first title defense against the fellow UFC veteran.  The fight never occurred, however, as PWP disappeared after this inaugural event.

Sylvia fought Vince Lucero at CFX/Extreme Challenge on December 11. Sylvia won the fight by submission due to punches.

Titan Fighting Championship

Sylvia fought Abe Wagner at Titan Fighting Championships 16 (Sylvia replaced Todd Duffee), Sylvia weighed in at 311 pounds and was defeated 32 seconds into the first round, ending his 4 fight win streak.
The super heavyweight matchup served as the main event of Friday night's HDNet-broadcast event, which took place at Memorial Hall in Kansas City, Kan.

Wagner's speed advantage was evident in the opening seconds, and he looked to pepper Sylvia with strikes on multiple levels as he retreated and stayed away from his opponent's length. Then a right hand brought about the beginning of the end.

Wagner caught Sylvia on the temple, and the former UFC champ was visibly staggered. As "The Maine-iac" tried to recover, Wagner went on the assault with jackhammer punches that chased Sylvia across the cage. Sylvia avoided the shots as he retreated, but once he reached the cage, Wagner landed a four-punch combination that saw his opponent slump to the canvas. Referee Jason Herzog wasted little time in rushing in to call the fight, and the decision was justified when Sylvia stumbled as he returned to his feet.  The entire process took just 32 seconds.

Fight Tour

Sylvia was originally scheduled to face Shayne Adams (1–2) on August 13 at a Fight Tour event at the Rockford Metro Centre in Rockford, Illinois. But due to a scheduling conflict with the athletic commission the event will now take place on August 20. Sylvia was then scheduled to face Brian Heden at the August 20 Fight Tour event because the Illinois Athletic Commission would not approve the fight between Adams and Sylvia. However the bout between Sylvia and Heden was later scrapped for unknown reasons and Sylvia would now face submission specialist Patrick Barrentine. Sylvia defeated Barrentine via TKO in the first round. Sylvia weighed in at 280.5 pounds for the bout, 30 pounds lighter than his previous bout against Wagner.

ProElite

Sylvia was expected to take on Pedro Rizzo at ProElite 2 on November 5, However Rizzo later pulled out of the bout due to injury.
Sylvia instead competed against German heavyweight Andreas Kraniotakes and won the fight via unanimous decision.

New England Fights
Sylvia fought against Randy Smith at NEF: Fight Night 3 on June 16 in his home state of Maine.
Sylvia defeated Smith in 12 seconds via TKO.

ONE Fighting Championship
In mid-July 2012, it was announced that Tim Sylvia had signed with the Asia-based promotion ONE Championship.  The promotion quickly announced that Sylvia would face Andrei Arlovski in his debut, marking the fourth time the two fighters had faced each other.
Sylvia and Arlovski faced off at ONE Fighting Championship: Pride of a Nation on August 31, 2012 in Manila. The fight between Tim Sylvia and Andrei Arlovski ended in a no-contest due to an illegal soccer kick by Andrei Arlovski. According to ONE FC rules at the time, soccer kicks are legal only if the referee clears the fighter to do so after determining the grounded fighter can still intelligently defend himself. Arlovski received no such clearance, the kick was deemed illegal.  Four days later, One FC eliminated the clearance restriction.

On May 31, 2013 Sylvia fought Tony Johnson at ONE FC 9: Rise to Power. Sylvia lost by TKO (doctor stoppage) in 3:25 of the third round.

Inoki Genome Federation
Sylvia fought Satoshi Ishii at Inoki Bom-Ba-Ye and lost by unanimous decision.

Fight Nights
Sylvia fought Dagestan prospect Ruslan Magomedov at Fight Nights: Battle of Moscow 13 and lost by unanimous decision.

Retirement
Sylvia was scheduled to face Juliano Coutinho at Reality Fighting on January 3, 2015, However Sylvia was denied medical clearance by the Mohegan Athletic Unit, and as a result the fight was cancelled. Sylvia weighed in at 371 pounds for the fight. When asked why the fight was cancelled Monte Cox, Sylvia’s manager, wrote on Facebook “Not 100 [percent] sure... because of his age he had to do a lot of meds at last minute,” Cox wrote. “In all he needed a stress test, MRI, EKG, eye, blood and physical." Apparently all the tests ordered by the Mohegan commission have made a significant impact on Sylvia’s bank account, as he wrote on Cox’s Facebook thread that he is “[$2,000] in the hole because of all the [tests] I had to do. After the cancelled fight Sylvia announced his retirement from MMA. He appeared in the cage alongside his proposed opponent and said an MRI issue prevented him from competing. “This is the end of my career,” Sylvia said at Mohegan Sun Arena, adding, “They said that I’ve received enough damage over 16 years.”

Professional wrestling career
On September 25, 2010, Sylvia made his pro wrestling debut, losing via submission to fellow mixed-martial-artist Josh Barnett, at IGF's Genome 13 event.

A grassroots Twitter campaign started on August 1, 2013 for Total Nonstop Action Wrestling president Dixie Carter to sign Sylvia and add him to the TNA ranks. Sylvia himself endorsed the campaign by re-tweeting it to his Twitter followers.

Personal life
Sylvia has a son, Maverick, from his previous relationship. In 2010, Sylvia confirmed that he is a police officer in the State of Illinois on a part-time basis (one day a month).

Championships and accomplishments

Mixed martial arts
Ultimate Fighting Championship
UFC Heavyweight Championship (Two times)
Fight of the Night (One time)
Powerhouse World Promotions
PWP Heavyweight Championship (One time)
International Sport Karate Association
ISKA MMA Super heavyweight Championship (One time)
ICON Sport
Superbrawl Return of the Heavyweights Tournament Winner
Extreme Challenge
Extreme Challenge 47 Heavyweight Tournament Winner

Mixed martial arts record

|-
| Loss
| align=center| 31–10 (1)
| Ruslan Magomedov
| Decision (unanimous)
| Fight Nights: Battle of Moscow 13
| 
| align=center| 3
| align=center| 5:00
| Moscow, Russia
| 
|-
| Loss
| align=center| 31–9 (1)
| Tony Johnson
| TKO (doctor stoppage)
| ONE Fighting Championship: Rise to Power
| 
| align=center| 3
| align=center| 3:25
| Pasay, Philippines
| 
|-
| Loss
| align=center| 31–8 (1)
| Satoshi Ishii
| Decision (unanimous)
| IGF: INOKI-BOM-BA-YE 2012
| 
| align=center| 3
| align=center| 5:00
| Tokyo, Japan
| 
|-
| NC
| align=center| 31–7 (1)
| Andrei Arlovski
| NC  (kick to grounded opponent)
| ONE Fighting Championship: Pride of a Nation
| 
| align=center| 2
| align=center| 4:46
| Quezon City, Philippines
| 
|-
| Win
| align=center| 31–7 
| Randy Smith
| TKO (punches)
| NEF Fight Night 3 
| 
| align=center| 1
| align=center| 0:12
| Lewiston, Maine, United States
| 
|-
| Win
| align=center| 30–7
| Andreas Kraniotakes
| Decision (unanimous) 
| ProElite: Big Guns
| 
| align=center| 3
| align=center| 5:00
| Moline, Illinois, United States
| 
|-
| Win
| align=center| 29–7
| Patrick Barrentine
| TKO (punches and elbows)
| Fight Tour
| 
| align=center| 1
| align=center| 2:09
| Rockford, Illinois, United States
| 
|-
| Loss
| align=center| 28–7
| Abe Wagner
| TKO (punches)
| Titan FC 16: Sylvia vs. Wagner
| 
| align=center| 1
| align=center| 0:32
| Kansas City, Kansas, United States
| 
|-
| Win
| align=center| 28–6
| Vince Lucero
| TKO (submission to punches)
| CFX: Extreme Challenge on Target
| 
| align=center| 1
| align=center| 2:44
| Minneapolis, Minnesota, United States
| 
|-
| Win
| align=center| 27–6
| Paul Buentello
| KO (punch)
| PWP: War on the Mainland
| 
| align=center| 2
| align=center| 4:57
| Irvine, California, United States
| 
|-
| Win
| align=center| 26–6
| Mariusz Pudzianowski
| TKO (submission to punches)
| Moosin: God of Martial Arts
| 
| align=center| 2
| align=center| 1:43
| Worcester, Massachusetts, United States
| 
|-
| Win
| align=center| 25–6
| Jason Riley
| TKO (punches)
| Adrenaline MMA IV
| 
| align=center| 1
| align=center| 2:32
| Council Bluffs, Iowa, United States
| 
|-
| Loss
| align=center| 24–6
| Ray Mercer
| KO (punch)
| Adrenaline MMA 3: Bragging Rights
| 
| align=center| 1
| align=center| 0:09
| Birmingham, Alabama, United States
| 
|-
| Loss
| align=center| 24–5
| Fedor Emelianenko
| Submission (rear-naked choke)
| Affliction: Banned
| 
| align=center| 1
| align=center| 0:36
| Anaheim, California, United States
|  
|-
| Loss
| align=center| 24–4
| Antônio Rodrigo Nogueira
| Submission (guillotine choke)
| UFC 81
| 
| align=center| 3
| align=center| 1:28
| Las Vegas, Nevada, United States
| 
|-
| Win
| align=center| 24–3
| Brandon Vera
| Decision (unanimous)
| UFC 77
| 
| align=center| 3
| align=center| 5:00
| Cincinnati, Ohio, United States
| 
|-
| Loss
| align=center| 23–3
| Randy Couture
| Decision (unanimous)
| UFC 68
| 
| align=center| 5
| align=center| 5:00
| Columbus, Ohio, United States
| 
|-
| Win
| align=center| 23–2
| Jeff Monson
| Decision (unanimous)
| UFC 65: Bad Intentions
| 
| align=center| 5
| align=center| 5:00
| Sacramento, California, United States
| 
|-
| Win
| align=center| 22–2
| Andrei Arlovski
| Decision (unanimous)
| UFC 61: Bitter Rivals
| 
| align=center| 5
| align=center| 5:00
| Las Vegas, Nevada, United States
| 
|-
| Win
| align=center| 21–2
| Andrei Arlovski
| TKO (punches)
| UFC 59: Reality Check
| 
| align=center| 1
| align=center| 2:43
| Anaheim, California, United States
| 
|-
| Win
| align=center| 20–2
| Assuerio Silva
| Decision (unanimous)
| UFC Fight Night 3
| 
| align=center| 3
| align=center| 5:00
| Las Vegas, Nevada, United States
| 
|-
| Win
| align=center| 19–2
| Tra Telligman
| KO (head kick)
| UFC 54
| 
| align=center| 1
| align=center| 4:59
| Las Vegas, Nevada, United States
| 
|-
| Win
| align=center| 18–2
| Mike Block
| TKO (punches)
| IFC: Caged Combat
| 
| align=center| 1
| align=center| 1:26
| Columbus, Ohio, United States
| 
|-
| Loss
| align=center| 17–2
| Andrei Arlovski
| Submission (achilles lock)
| UFC 51
| 
| align=center| 1
| align=center| 0:47
| Las Vegas, Nevada, United States
| 
|-
| Win
| align=center| 17–1
| Wes Sims
| TKO (punches)
| Superbrawl 38
| 
| align=center| 1
| align=center| 1:32
| Honolulu, Hawaii, United States
| 
|-
| Loss
| align=center| 16–1
| Frank Mir
| Technical Submission (armbar)
| UFC 48
| 
| align=center| 1
| align=center| 0:50
| Las Vegas, Nevada, United States
| 
|-
| Win
| align=center| 16–0
| Gan McGee
| TKO (punches)
| UFC 44
| 
| align=center| 1
| align=center| 1:54
| Las Vegas, Nevada, United States
| 
|-
| Win
| align=center| 15–0
| Ricco Rodriguez
| TKO (punches)
| UFC 41
| 
| align=center| 1
| align=center| 3:09
| Atlantic City, New Jersey, United States
| 
|-
| Win
| align=center| 14–0
| Wesley Correira
| TKO (corner stoppage)
| UFC 39
| 
| align=center| 2
| align=center| 1:43
| Uncasville, Connecticut, United States
| 
|-
| Win
| align=center| 13–0
| Jeff Gerlick
| TKO (punches)
| Extreme Challenge 48
| 
| align=center| 1
| align=center| 3:17
| Tama, Iowa, United States
| 
|-
| Win
| align=center| 12–0
| Mike Whitehead
| TKO (knee and punches)
| Superbrawl 24: ROTH 2
| 
| align=center| 1
| align=center| 2:38
| Honolulu, Hawaii, United States
| 
|-
| Win
| align=center| 11–0
| Jason Lambert
| TKO (doctor stoppage)
| Superbrawl 24: ROTH 2
| 
| align=center| 2
| align=center| 4:13
| Honolulu, Hawaii, United States
| 
|-
| Win
| align=center| 10–0
| Boyd Ballard
| KO (knee)
| Superbrawl 24: ROTH 2
| 
| align=center| 1
| align=center| 3:21
| Honolulu, Hawaii, United States
| 
|-
| Win
| align=center| 9–0
| Mike Whitehead
| TKO (punches)
| Superbrawl 24: ROTH 1
| 
| align=center| 1
| align=center| 3:46
| Honolulu, Hawaii, United States
| 
|-
| Win
| align=center| 8–0
| Matt Frembling
| Decision (unanimous)
| Extreme Challenge 47
| 
| align=center| 2
| align=center| 5:00
| Orem, Utah, United States
| 
|-
| Win
| align=center| 7–0
| Gino de la Cruz
| TKO (punches)
| Extreme Challenge 47
| 
| align=center| 1
| align=center| 0:43
| Orem, Utah, United States
| 
|-
| Win
| align=center| 6–0
| Ernest Henderson
| TKO (fell out of the ring)
| Extreme Challenge 47
| 
| align=center| 1
| align=center| 0:29
| Orem, Utah, United States
| 
|-
| Win
| align=center| 5–0
| Greg Wikan
| Submission (choke)
| Extreme Challenge Trials
| 
| align=center| 3
| align=center| 2:20
| Davenport, Iowa, United States
| 
|-
| Win
| align=center| 4–0
| Ben Rothwell
| Decision (unanimous)
| Extreme Challenge 42
| 
| align=center| 3
| align=center| 5:00
| Davenport, Iowa, United States
| 
|-
| Win
| align=center| 3–0
| Greg Wikan
| TKO (corner stoppage)
| UW: Ultimate Fight Minnesota
| 
| align=center| 1
| align=center| 5:00
| Bloomington, Minnesota, United States
| 
|-
| Win
| align=center| 2–0
| Gabe Beauperthy
| Submission (choke)
| GC 3: Showdown at Soboba
| 
| align=center| 2
| align=center| 4:16
| Friant, California, United States
| 
|-
| Win
| align=center| 1–0
| Randy Durant
| TKO (punches)
| IFC: Battleground 2001
| 
| align=center| 1
| align=center| 2:05
| Atlantic City, New Jersey, United States
|

Pay-Per-View Bouts

See also
List of male mixed martial artists
List of sportspeople sanctioned for doping offences

References

External links
Official Fan Gear

Official Tim Sylvia Tee KO Page

1974 births
American male professional wrestlers
American male mixed martial artists
American male karateka
American practitioners of Brazilian jiu-jitsu
American sportspeople in doping cases
Doping cases in mixed martial arts
Heavyweight mixed martial artists
Super heavyweight mixed martial artists
Mixed martial artists utilizing karate
Mixed martial artists utilizing boxing
Mixed martial artists utilizing wrestling
Mixed martial artists utilizing Brazilian jiu-jitsu
Living people
Mixed martial artists from Maine
People from Bettendorf, Iowa
People from Ellsworth, Maine
Professional wrestlers from Maine
Ultimate Fighting Championship champions
Ultimate Fighting Championship male fighters